The Khashm el-Girba Dam is a gravity and embankment composite dam on the Atbarah River about  south of Khashm El Girba in Eastern Sudan. The primary purpose of the dam is irrigation.

The dam is equipped with canal headworks, located on its left bank, which divert water into a canal. When water levels in the reservoir are low, three pumps move water into the canal.

The main portion of the dam is an earthen embankment; the spillway and irrigation headworks sections are concrete gravity.

See also

Upper Atbara and Setit Dam Complex

References

Dams completed in 1964
Energy infrastructure completed in 1963
Dams in Sudan
Dams in the Nile basin
Atbarah River
Hydroelectric power stations in Sudan